I Got Issues is the sixth studio album by American rapper YG. It was released through Def Jam Recordings and 4Hunnid Records on September 30, 2022. The album features guest appearances from Mozzy, D3szn, Duki, Cuco, J. Cole, Moneybagg Yo, H.E.R., Roddy Ricch, Post Malone, and Nas. Production was handled by a variety of record producers, including Bijan Amir, Larry Jayy, Reece Beats, Ambiance Sound, DJ Vision, Swish, Mike Crook, Blake Straus, Tom Levesque, Gibbo, 18YOMAN, and Lil Rich, among others.

Background
The album was originally called Pray for Me before being changed to I Got Issues. Through a video posted to Instagram in September 2022 during the release week, YG commented on the album: The album I Got Issues is basically insight on my life, an update on my life. I feel like my people haven't heard from me in a real way, in a long time. So I'm giving them this album…I'm here with all my issues, you know what I'm sayin'?

Critical reception
TiVo Staff from AllMusic criticized the album "YG's bouncing between styles gives I Got Issues a scattered flow that pushes the best tracks to the forefront and makes the weaker material feel all the more tedious."<ref name="Allmusic"

Release and promotion
On September 1, 2022, YG announced the title of the album and its release date and he shared its cover art. The pre-order was available on Apple Music on September 9, 2022. The tracklist was revealed a few weeks later through its pre-order.

Singles
The lead single of the album, "Scared Money", which features fellow American rappers J. Cole and Moneybagg Yo, was released on February 4, 2022. The second single, "Toxic", was released on August 12, 2022. The third single, "Alone", was released along with the pre-order of the album on September 9, 2022. The fourth and final single, "Maniac", was released on September 23, 2022.

Track listing

Notes
 signifies a co-producer

Charts

References

2022 albums
YG (rapper) albums
Def Jam Recordings albums
Albums produced by Hit-Boy